Valdelaume is a commune in the Deux-Sèvres department in western France. It was established on 1 January 2019 by merger of the former communes of Hanc (the seat), Ardilleux, Bouin and Pioussay.

See also
Communes of the Deux-Sèvres department

References

Communes of Deux-Sèvres
Populated places established in 2019
2019 establishments in France